The Night Watch is a dark, 2006 historical fiction novel by  Sarah Waters. It was shortlisted for both the 2006 Man Booker Prize and the 2006 Orange Prize. The novel, which is told backward through third-person narrative, takes place in 1940s London during and after World War II. The storyline follows the fragmented lives and the strange interconnections between Kay, Helen and Julia, three lesbians; Viv, a straight woman; and Duncan, her brother, whose sexuality is ambiguous. The war, with its never-ending night watches, serves as a horrifying backdrop and metaphor of the morbidity that surrounds life and love.

Plot summary
The novel begins in 1947 with Kay Langrish, a woman broken by the war. She spends her days locked in her room in London, her only human contact being with another lesbian, Mickey.  One night, Viv appears and hands Kay a gold ring.

Viv works as an assistant to Helen, who runs a match-making agency near Bond Street. When Helen's girlfriend Julia doesn't come home one night, Helen is overcome with worry and jealousy. After work, Viv has dinner with her brother Duncan and Duncan's roommate, an older gentleman named Mr Mundy. 

Helen and Viv receive an unexpected visit from Robert Fraser, Duncan’s old cellmate. Viv dismisses Fraser, feeling as though he thinks she and her father haven’t done enough to help Duncan’s situation and explains that he simply doesn’t know everything.

Duncan accompanies Mr Mundy, or "Uncle Horace," as he refers to him in public, to his Christian Science doctor at Lavender Hill.  After having dinner with his sister, Duncan works at the candle factory. When he leaves work, Duncan is surprised to see Fraser waiting for him at the gates. He invites Duncan to a pub by the water, and Duncan reluctantly agrees, mainly because he doesn't want Mr Mundy to worry. Fraser makes several calls at Duncan's for dinner.  One night, however, he doesn't show up, and Duncan is quite upset, while Mr Mundy is relieved. Duncan decides to find Fraser, leaving Mr Mundy home alone.  

The novel moves back three years, to 1944. Duncan has been imprisoned in Wormwood Scrubs for three years now, and Viv and her father visit him once a month. Viv is working as a typist and lodges at a boarding house with some of her co-workers. She meets Reggie, who is married, at anonymous hotels once every five weeks, whenever Reggie is permitted leave from Wales. When her "friend" is late, Viv realizes that she must be pregnant, and hesitates to tell Reggie.  

Kay works as an emergency response ambulance worker, cleaning up after air raids. One night, Kay and her coworker Mickey are sent out to take a woman to the hospital as she miscarries. On the same night, Kay learns of an air raid that occurred on her street. Kay panics and runs to the rubble to where her flat used to be, and cries thinking Helen is dead.

Helen works for the government in a division that assists those who've lost their belongings in the war.  By chance she runs into Julia, a woman who was once acquainted with Kay. On her birthday, Helen is restless and alone at home, and decides to leave for Julia's flat. They take a walk, and when another air raid alarm sounds, they run and hide from the chaos. Nights later, she realizes she's late to go home from Julia's, and they hurry back to Helen and Kay's flat.

The action shifts back another three years, to 1941. On  a crowded train, Viv meets a soldier named Reggie, who tells her he is stuck in an unhappy marriage. Duncan and his friend Alec are angry at their families and the government when Alec receives his service papers. They decide to make a statement with deadly consequences. Kay and Mickey respond to an emergency call.

Awards
 Man Booker Prize for Fiction (shortlist), 2006
 Orange Prize for Fiction (shortlist), 2006
 Lambda Literary Award for Lesbian Fiction, 2007

TV-movie adaptation
On 25 November 2010, BBC2 network announced the cast for the 90-minute television adaptation of The Night Watch. It was adapted by Paula Milne and directed by Richard Laxton and was broadcast on 12 July 2011 on BBC Two.

Cast:

 Anna Maxwell Martin as Kay Langrish
 Claire Foy as Helen Giniver
 Jodie Whittaker as Viv
 Harry Treadaway as Duncan Pearce
 Anna Wilson-Jones as Julia Standing
 Tom Weston-Jones as Jack Brown
 JJ Feild as Robert Fraser
 Liam Garrigan as Reggie
 Claudie Blakley as Nancy
 Kenneth Cranham as Mr Mundy

References

External links
Book description at Sarah Waters' official webpage
Smoother than velvet: Book review at The Guardian
This Is London: Book review at the New York Times
Great book on London during the Blitz Book review at Nishita's Rants and Raves

Historical novels
Novels set during World War II
2006 British novels
English novels
Novels by Sarah Waters
Novels set in London
Fiction set in 1941
Fiction set in 1944
Novels set in the 1940s
British novels adapted into films
2000s LGBT novels
Virago Press books
2006 LGBT-related literary works